Monroe County is a county located in the southwestern part of the U.S. state of Alabama. As of the 2020 census, the population was 19,772. Its county seat is Monroeville. Its name is in honor of James Monroe, fifth President of the United States. It is a dry county, in which the sale of alcoholic beverages is restricted or prohibited, but Frisco City and Monroeville are wet cities.

In 1997, the Alabama Legislature designated Monroeville and Monroe County as the "Literary Capital of Alabama". It is the birthplace of notable writer Harper Lee and served as the childhood home for Truman Capote, her lifelong friend and a fellow writer. Lee lived here most of her life. The enduring popularity of her novel, To Kill a Mockingbird (1960), as well as its film and stage adaptations, has attracted tourists to the city and area. Monroeville is also central to the 2019 film Just Mercy, based upon the 2014 eponymous book by Bryan Stevenson, recounting the wrongful conviction and sentencing to death of African American Walter McMillian.

History
For thousands of years the area was inhabited by indigenous peoples.  In historic times, it was primarily the territory of the Muscogee or Creek peoples, who became known to European-American settlers as one of the Five Civilized Tribes of the Southeast.

The prominent Upper Creek chief Red Eagle (also known as William Weatherford), of the Wind Clan, settled here after the Creek War (1813-1814). At the time, the United States was also involved in the War of 1812 against Great Britain. Red Eagle established a successful cotton plantation. He was of Creek and European descent, and had adopted the system of chattel slavery to gain workers for his plantation and horse breeding. In the 1830s the United States forced the removal of most of the Creek people from Alabama to Indian Territory (now Oklahoma), in order to take over their territory.

The area was settled by European Americans, primarily of English and Scots-Irish descent. It was largely developed as cotton plantations in the antebellum years. Planters moving from the Upper South sometimes brought slave workers with them, or purchased more slaves from traders and markets after acquiring land. The population was made up of numerous slaves, who in some sections outnumbered the whites.

Following the American Civil War and Emancipation, in the period after the Reconstruction era and into the early 20th century, white Democrats regained control of the state legislature and worked to restore and maintain white supremacy. The legislature passed a new constitution in 1901 that disenfranchised most blacks and tens of thousands of poor whites, excluding them from the political system. The legislators also passed laws imposing racial segregation and other forms of Jim Crow, and centralized power in the legislature.

Late 19th century to present
White physical attacks against blacks were part of the oppressive social system. Racial terrorism was accomplished through lynchings of African Americans, mostly of men, which took place outside the justice system. They were often conducted as public displays on the courthouse square, spectacles attended by large white mobs in an enactment of their power. Monroe had a total of seventeen lynchings from 1877 to 1950, the second highest number of any county in Alabama.

The county seat, Monroeville, is the home of two notable 20th-century authors, Truman Capote and Nelle Harper Lee, who were childhood neighbors. The novelist Mark Childress and journalist Cynthia Tucker are also Monroe County natives. In 1997 the Alabama Legislature designated Monroeville and Monroe County as the "Literary Capital of Alabama".

The county is near the Gulf Coast and is affected by storms from the Gulf. It has twice been declared a disaster area by the federal government due to extensive hurricane damage: in September 1979 due to Hurricane Frederic, and in September 2004 due to Hurricane Ivan.

Attorney Bryan Stevenson published his memoir, Just Mercy: A Story of Justice and Redemption in 2014. He has worked since his early 20s in Montgomery, establishing the Equal Justice Initiative and serving as legal counsel for people on death row in Alabama prisons. He has succeeded in gaining freedom for more than 100 men who were wrongfully convicted. Among the cases he discusses is that of Walter McMillian of Monroeville, who was wrongfully convicted of murder in 1989. McMillian, an African American man, was sentenced to death by the trial judge, who overrode the lesser sentence reached by the jury. McMillian was kept on death row for 6 years, nearly 2 of which were prior to his trial, in an effort to make him confess. In 1993 the Alabama Appeals Court ruled that McMillian should be freed because of the lack of evidence, his alibi, the unreliability of witnesses, and mishandling of the trial.

Geography

Major highways
 U.S. Highway 84
 State Route 21
 State Route 41
 State Route 47
 State Route 59
 State Route 83
 State Route 136

Adjacent counties
Wilcox County (north)
Butler County (east-northeast)
Conecuh County (east)
Escambia County (southeast)
Baldwin County (southwest)
Clarke County (west)

Demographics

2020

As of the 2020 United States census, there were 19,772 people, 8,166 households, and 5,124 families residing in the county.

2010
According to the 2010 United States census:

55.1% White
41.7% Black
1.1% Native American
0.3% Asian 
0.0% Native Hawaiian or Pacific Islander 
1.4% Two or more ethnicities
1.0% Hispanic or Latino (of any ethnicity)

2000
As of the census of 2000, there were 24,324 people, 9,383 households and 6,774 families residing in the county.  The population density was 24 people per square mile (9/km2).  There were 11,343 housing units at an average density of 11 per square mile (4/km2).  The ethnic makeup of the county was 57.75% White, 40.07% Black or African American, 0.97% Native American, 0.29% Asian, 0.01% Pacific Islander, 0.13% from other races, and 0.79% from two or more ethnicities while 0.78% of the population were Hispanic or Latino of any ethnicity.

There were 9,383 households, out of which 35.60% had children under the age of 18 living with them, 52.30% married couples living together, 16.10% with a female householder and no husband present and 27.80% non-families. Slightly more than a quarter (25.70%) of all households were made up of individuals, and 11.10% had someone living alone who was 65 years of age or older.  The average household size was 2.57 and the average family size was 3.09.

In the county, the population was spread out, with 28.30% under the age of 18, 8.60% from 18 to 24, 26.80% from 25 to 44, 22.50% from 45 to 64, and 13.80% who were 65 years of age or older.  The median age was 35 years old. For every 100 females, there were 90.80 males.  For every 100 females, aged 18 and over, there were 86.40 males.

The median income for a household in the county was $29,093, and the median income for a family was $34,569. Males had a median income of $31,096 versus $18,767 for females. The per capita income for the county was $14,862.  About 18.20% of families and 21.30% of the population were below the poverty line, including 27.00% of those under age 18 and 21.40% of those aged 65 or over.

Government
Since 2018, the elected sheriff of Monroe County has been Democrat Tom Boatwright.

On November 2, 2020, Charles Andrews was sworn in as Monroeville's first elected African-American mayor.

Communities

City
Monroeville (county seat)

Towns
Beatrice
Excel
Frisco City
Vredenburgh

Census-designated places
Megargel
Peterman
Uriah

Unincorporated communities

Buena Vista
Burnt Corn
Finchburg
Franklin
Goodway
Hybart
Manistee
Mexia
Natchez
Old Salem
Old Texas
Perdue Hill
River Ridge
Scratch Ankle
Tunnel Springs
Vocation
Wainwright

Ghost town
Claiborne
Nadawah

Places of interest
Monroe County is home to several attractions, such as the Alabama River Museum, the Monroe County Heritage Museum, and the Courthouse Museum which hosts the annual stage production of To Kill a Mockingbird. The county also contains Claude Kelly State Park.

See also
National Register of Historic Places listings in Monroe County, Alabama
Properties on the Alabama Register of Landmarks and Heritage in Monroe County, Alabama

References

External links
 Monroeville / Monroe County Chamber of Commerce
 Coastal Gateway Regional Economic Development Alliance
 Monroe County Museum
 Monroe County map of roads/towns (map © 2007 Univ. of Alabama).
 South Alabama Community Website
 The Monroe Journal
 Monroe County Sheriffs Official Facebook Page

 
1815 establishments in Mississippi Territory
Populated places established in 1815